Zoltán Balog (born 22 February 1978) is a former Hungarian professional football defender who currently plays for the Austrian team FC Andau, in the 1. Klasse Nord.

National team 
Balog made his debut on 31 May 2005, in Metz against France.

(Statistics correct as of 20 July 2009)

Statistics

External links
Viborg FF profile
Career statistics at Danmarks Radio
Player profile at HLSZ 
Futball-adattár 

1978 births
Living people
People from Békés
Hungarian footballers
Association football defenders
Hungary youth international footballers
Hungary international footballers
Békéscsaba 1912 Előre footballers
Royal Antwerp F.C. players
Budapesti VSC footballers
Ceglédi VSE footballers
Ferencvárosi TC footballers
Viborg FF players
Gyirmót FC Győr players
Nemzeti Bajnokság I players
Challenger Pro League players
Danish Superliga players
Hungarian expatriate footballers
Expatriate footballers in Belgium
Expatriate men's footballers in Denmark
Hungarian expatriate sportspeople in Belgium
Hungarian expatriate sportspeople in Denmark
Sportspeople from Békés County